Châteaufort is the name of two communes in France:

 Châteaufort, Alpes-de-Haute-Provence, in the Alpes-de-Haute-Provence département
 Châteaufort, Yvelines, in the Yvelines département